Memento is the 16th studio album and at the same time the comeback album of the German hard rock band Böhse Onkelz. It was released on 28 October 2016 on their then newly-founded label Matapaloz.

Title 
The title of the album Memento is Latin for "remember". The band was inspired to choose this name by the movie Memento.

Cover 
The band had asked their supporters in July 2016 to sent them pictures of their Onkelz-tattoos, promising them that all pictures would be printed on the CD or the booklet. With that, they wanted to thank their fans for the years of support and show the strong bonds between them and their fans.

Track listing 
 "Gott hat ein Problem" (Engl. "God's got a problem") – 5:01
 "Frei" ("Free") – 4:23
 "Markt und Moral" ("Market and morals"), 3:55
 "Jeder kriegt was er verdient" ("Everybody gets what he deserves") – 4:49
 "Mach's dir selbst" ("Do it yourself") – 3:31
 "Irgendwas für nichts" ("Something for nothing") – 3:26
 "Wo auch immer wir stehen" ("Wherever we are") – 6:38
 "Es ist sinnlos mit sich selbst zu spaßen" ("It's pointless to have fun only by yourself") – 4:40
 "Der Junge mit dem Schwefelholz" ("The boy with the match") – 7:43
 "Nach allen Regeln der Sucht" ("By the rules of addiction") – 5:05
 "Auf die Freundschaft" ("To friendship") – 4:09
 "52 Wochen" ("52 weeks") – 3:18

Personnel 
Kevin Russell – vocals
Stephan Weidner – additional vocals, bass guitar
Matthias Röhr – guitar
Peter Schorowsky – drums
Paul Taylor – piano

Charts

Weekly charts

Year-end charts

Certifications

References

External links 
Memento on Discogs

2016 albums
Böhse Onkelz albums
German-language albums